This is a list of books and publications related to the hippie subculture. It includes books written at the time about the counterculture of the 1960s and early 1970s, books that influenced the culture, and books published after its heyday that document or analyze the culture and period. The list includes both nonfiction and fictional works, with the fictional works including novels about the period. Each work is notable for its relation to the culture, in addition to any other notability it has.

Period and pre-period works

Novels  
Walden by Henry David Thoreau, 1854. Promoted the idea of simple living and self-sufficiency, emphasizing the importance of being in touch with nature and rejecting materialism. The book's message of individualism, non-conformity, and living in harmony with nature inspired many members of the hippie movement to reject mainstream values and embrace a more sustainable, back-to-the-land lifestyle.
Alice's Adventures in Wonderland by Lewis Carroll, 1865. Novel  which involves abandonment of logic and is an example of literary nonsense. Popularized by the 1967 Jefferson Airplane song "White Rabbit"
Demian by Hermann Hesse, 1919. Explored themes of self-discovery, spirituality, and the rejection of societal norms and conventions. The book's journey of self-realization and its rejection of traditional values inspired a countercultural movement that emphasized individuality and spiritual growth, resonating with many members of the hippie generation.
Siddhartha by Herman Hesse, 1922. Explored the journey of self-discovery and spiritual enlightenment, inspiring a countercultural movement focused on rejecting materialism and embracing Eastern philosophy, mindfulness, and alternative lifestyles.
Steppenwolf, by Hermann Hesse, 1927, another cult novel
On the Road by Jack Kerouac, 1957.  Promoted a spirit of adventure, freedom, and non-conformity, as well as celebrating the Beat generation's rejection of mainstream values and embrace of jazz, drugs, and alternative lifestyles. The book's depiction of a cross-country journey and the search for meaning and purpose resonated with many members of the hippie generation and inspired a sense of wanderlust and liberation.
Naked Lunch by William S. Burroughs, 1959. Pushed the boundaries of traditional literary norms and conventions, challenging societal norms and values, and exploring themes of counterculture, drug use, sexuality, and the nature of reality, inspiring a non-conformist and rebellious spirit among the hippie movement.
Stranger in a Strange Land, by Robert Heinlein, 1961. Cult science fiction novel which described a variant on the free love philosophy
Island, Aldous Huxley, 1962
One Flew Over the Cuckoo's Nest, a 1962 novel about individualism in a mental hospital written by Ken Kesey, who was associated with both beatniks and hippies, including the Merry Pranksters
A Clockwork Orange by Anthony Burgess, 1962. Explored themes of free will, morality, and the nature of good and evil, as well as commenting on the state of society and government control. The book's ultra-violent, futuristic setting and its depiction of youthful rebellion inspired a spirit of resistance and individualism among the hippie generation.
Been Down So Long It Looks Like Up to Me by Richard Fariña, 1966. An autobiographical novel by Richard Fariña about the early sixties and the transition from beatniks to hippies. Depicts a countercultural lifestyle that was filled with experimentation, non-conformity, and a rejection of societal norms, inspiring a sense of freedom and individuality among the hippie movement. The book also tackled themes of youth rebellion, education, and the search for meaning and purpose, resonating with many members of the hippie generation.
In Watermelon Sugar, by Richard Brautigan, 1968. A writer associated with hippies and the San Francisco Renaissance
Memoirs of a Beatnik, by Diane di Prima, 1969, novelistic pseudo-memoir by a Beat poet
The Left Hand of Darkness by Ursula K. Le Guin, 1969. Challenged traditional gender roles and norms, promoting gender fluidity and sexual liberation, and encouraging a new understanding of individuality and societal expectations.
Another Roadside Attraction, by Tom Robbins, 1971. Cult novel from the period
The Drifters by James Michener, 1971
The Sweetmeat Saga: The Epic Story of the Sixties by G. F. Gravenson, 1971. Experimental novel set in 1966 about a rock duo who goes missing.
Divine Right's Trip: A Novel of the Counterculture, by Gurney Norman, 1972, describing a Volkswagen bus road trip

Poetry
Stanyan Street and other Sorrows: Poems, by Rod McKuen, with Stanyan Street referring to the street in San Francisco which borders on Haight-Ashbury, a hippie cultural center
Howl and Other Poems, by Allen Ginsberg, 1956
the "Desiderata", a poem by Max Ehrmann
The Scripture of the Golden Eternity, by Jack Kerouac, 1960
The Prophet, by Kahlil Gibran, 1923
The Love Book, by Lenore Kandel, 1966

Nonfiction 
The Function of the Orgasm by Wilhelm Reich, 1927 creator of the orgone hypothesis
The Doors of Perception by Aldous Huxley, 1954. Encouraged the exploration of spirituality, consciousness, and psychoactive drug use, fostering a new perspective on the human mind and its potential.
The Art of Loving, by Erich Fromm, 1956
The Phenomenon of Man, by Pierre Teilhard de Chardin, 1959
Morning of the Magicians, by Louis Pauwels and Jacques Bergier, 1960, about magic, occult, and the supernatural
The Psychedelic Experience: A Manual Based on the Tibetan Book of the Dead, by Timothy Leary, 1964. A syncretic work combining a Tibetan Buddhist holy book with the psychedelic experience, 
The Book – On the Taboo Against Knowing Who You Are, by Alan Watts, 1966. 
The Medium is the Massage, by Marshall McLuhan, 1967
The Electric Kool-Aid Acid Test, by Tom Wolfe, 1968, about Ken Kesey and the Merry Pranksters
We Are the People Our Parents Warned Us Against: The Classic Account of the 1960s Counter-Culture in San Francisco by Nicholas Von Hoffman, 1968
Woodstock Nation, by yippie Abbie Hoffman, 1969. describing his experience at the Woodstock festival
Operating Manual for Spaceship Earth and I Seem to Be a Verb, by Buckminster Fuller, 1969
The Strawberry Statement by James Simon Kunen, 1969
The Making of a Counter Culture, by Theodore Roszak, 1969.
The Greening of America, by Charles A. Reich, 1970.
Be Here Now by Ram Dass, 1970, about his contacts with Bhagavan Das, Neem Karoli Baba, and Baba Hari Dass. The book has an extensive bibliography of works important to spiritual seekers of the time
Monday Night Class, by Stephen Gaskin, founder of The Farm, 1970
Go Ask Alice, anonymous (at the time) account of a teenage girl's descent into drug use. Later learned to be authored by Beatrice Sparks, 1971
A Separate Reality, by Carlos Castaneda, 1971, account of a likely fictitious encounter with a Native American shaman
The Velvet Monkey Wrench, by John Muir, car maintenance guru of the 1960s, 1973
Cutting through Spiritual Materialism, by Chogyam Trungpa, 1973
The Yellow Book: The Sayings of Baba Hari Dass 1973
The Hog Farm Family & Friends, Wavy Gravy, 1974
Silence Speaks: Aphorisms From the Chalkboard of Baba Hari Dass, 1977
Teaching as a Subversive Activity, by Neil Postman and Charles Weingartner, 1979
Teach Your Own, John Holt, 1981. ASIN: B00A8SIKBA
 Drumming at the Edge of Magic: A Journey into the Spirit of Percussion, by Mickey Hart, 1990.
Gestalt Therapy Verbatim, by Fritz Perls,  
Hippie, a memoir by counterculture figure and businessman Barry Miles, 2000

Guides 
Rise Up Singing a book of songs relevant to the culture
New Age Vegetarian Cookbook, by Max Heindel
Tassajara cooking, by Edward Espe Brown, 
Where There Is No Doctor: A Village Health Care Handbook by David Werner, 1970
Whole Earth Catalog, edited and published by Stewart Brand
Living on the Earth, by Alicia Bay Laurel
Foxfire Books series, from the magazine of the same name, popular with the 1970s back-to-the-land movement 
Steal this book, by yippie Abbie Hoffman, 1971, a guide to living with little or no money, and to living outside the rules of establishment culture
Our Bodies, Ourselves, by the Boston Women's Health Book Collective, 1973
Total Orgasm, by Jack Rosenberg, 
The Open Classroom, by Herbert Kohl
est: The Steersman Handbook, by Leslie Stevens
How to Keep Your Volkswagen Alive, by John Muir
Ashtanga Yoga Primer, Baba Hari Dass,

Photography

 Festival:The Book of American Celebrations, by Jerry Hopkins with Harrison Avila and Baron Wolman, 1970
 Linda McCartney's Sixties: Portrait of an Era, by Linda McCartney, 1992
  Bliss: Transformational Festivals & the Neo Hippie by Steve Schapiro

Post-period works

Novels and children's literature
Vineland, by Thomas Pynchon, novel of the changes from 1960s to 1980s counterculture in Northern California
Summer of Love, by Lisa Mason, novel about the period
Baby Driver, a semi-autobiographical novel by Jan Kerouac, daughter of Jack Kerouac
My Hippie Grandmother, a children's picture book by Reeve Lindbergh and Abby Carter, 2003
Existential Trips, a short alternative science fiction story on Kindle by William Bevill. Featuring secret agents Jack Kerouac, Allen Ginsberg, and William Burroughs. 2020

Nonfiction 
Chrisann Brennan: The Bite in the Apple: A Memoir of My Life with Steve Jobs
Chelsea Cain:Dharma Girl (a memoir of growing up on a commune)
Peter CoyoteSleeping Where I Fall (memoir)
John Curl: Memories of Drop City: The First Hippie Commune of the 1960s and the Summer of Love 
Zuko Džumhur: Letters from Asia (Pisma iz Azije) 1973; the book mentions hippies in Afghanistan 
Mickey Hart:The Art of the Filmore 1966–1971
 Albert Hofmann:LSD, My Problem Child
Barney Hoskyns: Beneath the Diamond Sky: Haight-Ashbury 1965–1970
Rory MacLean:Magic Bus: On the Hippie Trail from Istanbul to India
Timothy Miller: The Hippies and American Values
Cleo Odzer: Goa Freaks: My Hippie Years in India
Fred Turner: From Counterculture to Cyberculture: Stewart Brand, the Whole Earth Network and the Rise of Digital Utopianism

Magazines 
Whole Earth Catalog and CoEvolution Quarterly, edited and published by Stewart Brand 
San Francisco Oracle, an underground newspaper
International Times, a magazine of the sixties UK underground
Oz, a magazine of the sixties UK underground
The Buddhist Third Class Junk Mail Oracle, by D.A. Levy, a Cleveland underground newspaper
The Realist, edited by Paul Krassner
Mother Earth News
Communities
Utne Reader, a magazine postdating the hippie period, but covering much of the same material
Sing Out!
 Nambassa Festival Newsletter 1, edited by Peter Terry, Lorraine Ward and Bernard Woods. Published in 1976 and 1977
 The Nambassa Sun and the Nambassa Waves newspapers, published quarterly from 1978 to 1981.

Underground comics by Harrison avila 
Fabulous Furry Freak Brothers, underground comix featuring archetypal hippies
Zap Comix, one of the first underground comix from San Francisco
Slow Death, published by Last Gasp

Spanish-language books
La Tumba, by José Agustín, 1964 novel about a Mexico City upper class teenager, followed by De Perfil, 1966

See also
 List of films related to the hippie subculture
 Psychedelic literature, list of works
 Underground press
 Straight Arrow Press
 Ronin Publishing
 Bookpeople
 La Onda, a Mexican 1960s counterculture movement

References

Hippie movement
Bibliographies of subcultures
Lists of books